UTAU is a Japanese singing synthesizer application created by Ameya/Ayame. This program is similar to the VOCALOID software, with the difference being it is shareware instead of under a third party licensing.

Overview
In March 2008, Ameya/Ayame released UTAU, a free, advanced support tool shareware software that was free-to-download from its main website. UTAU was originally created to assist this process using concatenative synthesis. UTAU is able to use WAV files provided by the user, so that a singing voice can be synthesized by introducing song lyrics and melody. It comes with AQUEST's voice synthesizer "AquesTalk" for synthesizing the voice samples of the default voicebank, Utane Uta (also nicknamed Defoko ( meaning 'Default Girl' in Japanese)) on UTAU's initial launch, after which the generator deletes itself. Voices made for the UTAU program are officially called "UTAU" as well, though they are colloquially known as "UTAUloids", a reference to VOCALOID. They are also called "voicebanks" (more common in English-speaking areas) and "(voice) libraries" in Japan. A myriad number of voicebanks have been developed by independent users. These voicebanks are normally distributed directly from their creators via internet download, but some are sold as part of commercial projects.

UTAU is mostly a Japanese program and thus many of its voices are created specifically for the Japanese language. However, the number of available languages has been expanded by the users. English is a common language for UTAU to sing in. While there are a high number of bilingual UTAU, there are also multilingual UTAU that can sing in three or more languages. Often, X-SAMPA format is used for English voicebanks. However, other formats based on X-SAMPA are also used, such as Cz Phonemes (or C-ZAMPA) for some English VCCV voicebanks. Regardless of the voice's language, a user's computer must be in the Japanese locale or use AppLocale in order to run the software. Most of its documentation is in Japanese, but the User Manual has been translated into English. The program's interface was translated to English by Ameya, and other translations are still pending. However, the program still requires support for Japanese text.

UTAU's project files are saved under the "" (Utau Sequence Text) extension. These files can be freely distributed, allowing different UTAU to sing the same piece. It is important to make note of the guidelines the UST creator has provided in terms of the  distribution and use. Producers have developed several methods of producing their sound banks and results for the voicebanks vary because of this. UTAU also supports MIDI format and  format.

Ameya/Ayame added support for Unicode in an unreleased newer version of UTAU as per the screenshots posted on Twitter. The corresponding backend support tail fixed region as well as several other audio encodings has already been released, while frontend support is yet to be released as of September 2020. Ameya also updated UTAU to be compatible with 64-bit systems.

Configuration
The editor is capable of placing notes, entering phonemes, and changing pitch and volume on the piano roll. Only one track can be created in UTAU, and notes cannot be placed on top of each other. By default, only notes are displayed on the piano roll, but display settings can be changed to show the pitch curve, volume intensity, envelope, and flags. UTAU uses flags to change aspects of the voice, such as with low-pass and high-pass filters, and reducing or adding breathiness. These flags differ depending on the resampler used. Score information and data in the voicebank is processed with a resampler and wavtool based on the score created with the editor. Only one resampler can be utilized in a single  file. A formant filter is used to control changes in voice quality, which can be turned off.

The audio file to be loaded in is found by matching the symbols on the note with the audio file name in the voice library. However, a prefix.map file can change which subfolder the sample is taken from. The pitch of the synthesized voice is adjusted according to the difference between the original sound file and the pitch of the note in the editor. UTAU uses formant filters to prevent extreme changes in voice quality, which can be disabled. Batch processing is used to generate multiple notes at once. Cache files are created during this process. Depending on the resampler, the amount of cache files may increase. There are settings in the menu to delete cache files when the program is closed, or after a certain period of time.

There are built-in plugins which can automatically merge vowels, and the "Omakase/A la carte" settings which can add automatic pitch and vibrato to an entire file. Other plugins created by users can be added into the software, which perform various functions. The colors of the editor can also be changed in the setting.ini file.

Voices
As mentioned above, WAV files can be ported into UTAU. There can be hundreds, or in some cases, thousands, of these files in a single voicebank. Voices are installed by either placing them in the "voice" folder or dragging and dropping them onto the UTAU icon. These libraries also come with an  file which determines the timing and configuration of each sample. Frequency tables ( files) are used to process the waveform when changing the pitch in the editor. The voices may also come with image files most commonly being the .bmp format and standalone voice dialogues as some Vocaloids do. They also often include readme files which contain software information and terms of use. Character information files, commonly seen as character.txt, are also often included, which hold information that can be viewed in the "Voice preview" section of the GUI which labels the voicebank author, the name, a sample file to be played on click of the "sample" button, and the Voicebank image. It can also contain other parameters specified by the creator, such as "genre".

Some voicebanks are monosyllabic, collectively referred to as "CV" (consonant-vowel), whereas others use triphones to produce a smoother sound.
 These triphonetic voicebanks are collectively referred to as "VCV" (vowel-consonant-vowel). These take considerably more time and effort to make (being about seven times the size of a CV voicebank, in terms of lines in the  file), but produce a more natural result.

Later UTAU voices would include phonemes composed of vowels+consonants (VC) to accommodate languages other than Japanese. Methods that employ this include "CVVC" (in which a VC phoneme is placed between two CV phonemes), or a sister method "VCCV", which is based on CVVC, but contains a few differences (differentiation between aspirated and unaspirated VCs, consonant cluster support, etc.). "VCCV" is named the way it is to differentiate itself from its creator's past CVVC lists.

Since the audio files are independent files, they can be used in other software such as a DAW.

Development
The development of UTAU started when Ameya began to use Audacity to recombine samples of other singers, and Melodyne to pitch correct the samples and set them to music. The act of doing this was referred to as "human-powered VOCALOID". LOLI.COM, a musician who posted his own rap music to Nico Nico Douga, used his own voice for human-powered Vocaloid and released an audio editing software which could help users do the same. Since the process of doing "human-powered VOCALOID" by hand took a substantial amount of time and effort, Ameya began to develop a new tool which would aid the process.

The tool was announced on Nico Nico Douga on January 11, 2008. At that time, it was possible to adjust the timing of the sound, change the envelope of a note, and generate batch files. On 5 February 2008, a video was released showing the GUI. Here, it was possible to time stretch samples, create oto.ini files, and adjust the pitch bends of notes. On 5 March 2008, a video explaining the program's specifications was released on Nico Nico Douga, and on 15 March 2008, the tool was renamed UTAU.

The creator was a programmer by trade and not a specialist in vocal synthesis, but used previous knowledge to create UTAU. After its release, Ameya continued to improve UTAU, and started developing it in collaboration with other text-to-speech developers.

Audio files and copyright

Since UTAU can create a singing voice using any WAV files, it is possible to take the voice of an existing person and use it as data. Often, actors, singers, and celebrities will have clips of their voices re-purposed for use in UTAU. The creator, Ameya, once created a voice using data from a voice actor's CD.

In May 2008, Ameya decided to stop using audio data without permission for the time being, unless the voice actor allowed it.

Cultural impact

Though the software is very popular in Japan, its origins and cultural impact are owed to the already established popularity of the Vocaloid software. UTAU itself was first made famous when the creator of Kasane Teto released the character posing as a Vocaloid character as part of an April Fool's joke in 2008. The influence of the Vocaloid software also led to both programs commonly being used side by side. Often popular UTAU mascots like Kasane Teto appear in VOCALOID-based media such as Maker Hikōshiki Hatsune Mix or Hatsune Miku: Project DIVA.

Later, the UTAU software would have its own impact on Vocaloid and other vocal synthesizers, with a number of vocals either referencing UTAU or being produced for the engine to begin with. For example, Megurine Luka V4x was influenced by the UTAU vocal Gahata Meiji. Wat from Crypton Future Media also spoke to someone very familiar with UTAU and said that the conversation was "very interesting". Macne Nana of the Macne series later would become both a UTAU voice and a Vocaloid voice. The voice provider of English Vocaloid Ruby, Misha, had previously produced a Japanese-language UTAU named Makune Hachi. In addition, the vocalist for Dex, Kenji-B, created  for UTAU, and AkiGlancy, the vocalist behind Dex's partner Daina, gave her voice to the UTAU . Kikuko Inoue, the voice actress of Macne Coco White and Black (see Macne series) went on to voice a Vocaloid5 product by the name of Haruno Sora. The product came with two voicebanks, Natural and Cool. After the release of Vocaloid 3 vocal Tohoku Zunko, her two sisters Tohoku Itako and Tohoku Kiritan received UTAU vocals. Kiritan would later hold a crowdfunding campaign for her to become a Voiceroid. As well as its influence on Vocaloid, UTAU has served as a development launchpad for other commercial singing voice synthesizers. The most notable of these is Dreamtonics' Synthesizer V, which sprung from the development of the UTAU resampler known as Moresampler, both of which were developed by Kanru Hua.

Its main attraction is not only based on it being freely distributed on the internet, but because it allowed a user to insert their own voice into the database for use for music, opening the doors for users to further develop their own music. UTAU owes its growing popularity to its ability to provide a free method of creating voices for music use and has established numerous music producers working with the software on sites such as Nico Nico Douga and YouTube. Users also see it as an alternative to the Vocaloid software, which only offers a more limited supply of voices at a high price and may not offer the voice types they are seeking for music, as the large database of voices often has a much greater chance of offering the voice they seek. However, despite the number of voicebanks offered, the software has overall far fewer producers working with it than Vocaloid.

A radio station set up a 1-hour program containing nothing but Vocaloid and UTAU-based music.

In addition, an event called The UTAU M@STER was held regularly from 19 July 2012 onwards. The event was the main gathering of groups or circles and was held in a similar fashion to the Vocaloid-related event, THE VOC@LOID M@STER, which had existed since 2007.

Related software
Unlike Vocaloid, UTAU files are not restrictive as it is not a proprietary based license. These products were sold by Act2 and by converting their file format, were able to also work with the UTAU program. Later, the Macne packages Whisper☆Angel Sasayaki, Macne Nana 2S and Macne Petit 2S came with pre-built UTAU voicebanks.

The default voicebank "Defoko" (Utane Uta) borrows her voice from the software AquesTalk, specifically the voice "AquesTalk Female-1" produced by A-quest. Permission had been granted for her distribution free with the software. Utane Koe, Uta's "sister", also borrows her voice from the AquesTalk software. Namine Ritsu, a vocal originally built for UTAU, also was later added to another piece of software called Sinsy as Namine Ritsu S. Another vocal originally developed for the UTAU software, Yamine Renri, was also later added to Synthesizer V.

Due to the software's own copyright agreement, non-open license software such as VOCALOID are not permitted to be imported into the UTAU software. A number of plug-ins for the software have also been developed by users of the software which add and enhance the vocals of the software. The software program Sugarcape, based on the same freeware intention as UTAU, has already entered beta stage.
There was an official Mac version of UTAU released on May 27, 2011, named UTAU-Synth. It has approximately the same features as the Windows version. UTAU-Synth version can import both voices and songs made with the Windows version, but its project files and voicebank configurations are not fully compatible with the Windows version. In late 2017 it was mentioned that Plogue Art et Technologie, Inc. had a working redirect adaptation that would make UTAU vocals appear in its engine Alter/Ego.

OpenUTAU is an open-source unofficial successor to UTAU developed by Vocaloid producer StAkira, with a beta released in November 2021. The software was designed to be compatible with UTAU but with a modern user experience. Unlike UTAU, it does not require a Japanese system locale to function properly.

Usage in music
The licensed songs from the album Graduation from Lie, featuring Kasane Teto, were released for music downloads from Karen-T, under Crypton Future Media, as a special release. This is the first licensed release of any UTAU.

The voice library Momo Momone is used in the viral YouTube video "Nyan Cat".

See also
Nyan Cat
Dōjin music
Vocaloid
Cevio
Speech synthesis

References

External links
  (macOS version)
 
 Article on Japanese Wikipedia
 Developer blog

Electronic musical instruments
Singing software synthesizers
Shareware